Kaukolikai is a village in Lithuania. It is located in the Skuodas District Municipality. According to the 2011 census, the village had 285 residents.

The village is the hometown of Lithuanian singer Mia.

External links

Website of the Juozo alus brewery complex (in Lithuanian, English, German, Latvian and Russian)

References

Villages in Klaipėda County